Ostrogozhsky (masculine), Ostrogozhskaya (feminine), or Ostrogozhskoye (neuter) may refer to:
Ostrogozhsky District, a district of Voronezh Oblast, Russia
Ostrogozhskoye, a rural locality (a settlement) in Kaliningrad Oblast, Russia